is a Japanese football player who last played for Dinamo Zagreb II.

Club career
He made his professional debut in the Eerste Divisie for VVV-Venlo on 24 February 2017 in a game against Achilles '29.

References

External links
 

1997 births
Sportspeople from Chiba Prefecture
Living people
Japanese footballers
VVV-Venlo players
Japanese expatriate footballers
Expatriate footballers in the Netherlands
Eerste Divisie players
Association football midfielders